Konidela Production Company is an Indian film production company established by actor Ram Charan.

Film production

Film distribution

References 

Film production companies based in Hyderabad, India
Year of establishment missing